Dr Phytos Poetis, OM, Dr iur (Hamburg), FCIArb, Barrister, is an international lawyer.

Background
Poetis studied law in London, where he was called to the English Bar in 1961 by the "Honourable Society of the Middle Temple (Barrister-at-Law)".  Since then, he has continuously been involved in the theory and practice of international contracts.

He continued his law studies in Germany at the "University of Hamburg" and at the "Max-Planck-Institute for Foreign and Private International Law", where, in 1965, he earned the title of "Doctor of Laws", under the guidance of "Professor Dr Konrad Zweigert, Director of the Max-Planck-Institute for Foreign and Private International Law, and Justice of the Federal Constitutional Court of Germany ", with a comparative international law doctoral thesis (in German) entitled: "Defects of Consent in the International Contract Law of Germany, Switzerland, Greece, England and the United States of America".

Between 1975 and 1980, in addition to his practising law, he served as commercial manager, legal adviser and member of the corporate administration of "Coutinho Caro + Co" in Hamburg, a worldwide turnkey contractor, being responsible for the negotiation, drafting and implementation of contracts involving the delivery and installation of industrial plants and high-rise buildings.

In 1980 he was raised to the level of "Fellow of the Chartered Institute of Arbitrators" by its president, "Lord Donaldson, Master of the Rolls ", on the strength of his thesis "The Powers of the Engineer in Settlement of Disputes under the FIDIC-Conditions"; this was then published in the "Arbitration", the Official Journal of the Chartered Institute of Arbitrators, in the "Quantity Surveyor", and in the "Yearbook on International Arbitration".

Dr Poetis was awarded the title and the honour and was vested with the office of the Honorary Consul of the Federal Republic of Germany in 1998, in which he served actively till 2002.

In 2003 he was awarded the Order of Merit of the Federal Republic of Germany for "Outstanding Achievements in Law".

He travels globally negotiating projects, drafting contracts, acting as fire-brigade, when legal, commercial or technical problems arise.  He also lectures and delivers seminars on the specialist areas of export trade and international commercial arbitration.

Unique in his practice and possibly obvious is his conviction that "contracts, particularly contracts for technical projects, should, where possible, be negotiated and drafted by one and the same person who should be an international lawyer, with a commercial training, and who preferably has a technical understanding."

He further offers this definition and what the scope should be of the term 'international lawyer'. That an international lawyer is one that has the knowledge, experience and ability to think and understand the mentality and the legal approach of the negotiating partner(s).

That an international lawyer has the ability to negotiate with the contract party(-ies) in his language or in an international language. That an international lawyer shows the flexibility to travel and meet the contract party(-ies) wherever required, that an international lawyer has the ability to negotiate with foreigners and can finalise clauses or even whole contracts impromptu, with the personality to take commercial decisions impromptu, and has the ability to understand technical matters and the ability to take (thereon) decisions impromptu.

Since 1965 he has been the legal adviser to the German Embassy.

He was accredited, in 1975, as Official Interpreter and Translator to the Government of the Free and Hanseatic City of Hamburg for German-English-Greek.

From 1994 he extended the scope of his practice to working also as a European Patent Attorney in the field of Intellectual Property (IP) acting for numerous international companies.

"Dr Poetis ®" is a registered trade mark of Dr Phytos Poetis.

Until the Turkish invasion of Cyprus in 1974, his practice was based in Famagusta, after the invasion he moved his practice to Hamburg.  In 1992 he moved his practice back to Cyprus and is now based in Larnaca.

Honours and awards
 Modern Greek Literature Prize
 Honorary Consul of the Federal Republic of Germany
 Order of Merit of the Federal Republic of Germany (Outstanding Achievements in Law)
 Legal Adviser to the German Embassy
 Fellow of the Chartered Institute of Arbitrators
 Founder Member of the London Court of International Arbitration European Users’ Council
 Member of the Panel of Arbitrators of the American Arbitration Association

Selected publications and lectures
 Die Anknüpfung der Willensmängel im Internationalen Vertragsrecht Deutschlands, der Schweiz, Griechenlands, Englands und der Vereinigten Staaten von Amerika (Defects of Consent in the International Contract Law of Germany, Switzerland, Greece, England and the United States of America), Hamburg 1965

 About Legal Systems in General and the Law of Cyprus in Particular, Lecture before ΕΦΣΑ, Scientific and Philosophical Society of Famagusta, 1966

 Reformation of the Judiciary, A Comparative Study, Lecture before ΕΦΣΑ, Scientific and Philosophical Society of Famagusta, 1967

 Powers of the Engineer in Settlement of Disputes under the FIDIC-Conditions, published in: the Arbitration, the Quantity Surveyor and the Yearbook on International Arbitration, London 1980

 Die 20 wichtigsten Fragen und Antworten zum Immobilienerwerb in Zypern (The 20 Most Important Questions and Answers Regarding the Purchase of Immovables in Cyprus), published in: Investmentguide EU-Osterweiterung, Zürich, 2004

References

External links
The Order of Merit of the Federal Republic of Germany

Living people
British barristers
Patent attorneys
20th-century Cypriot lawyers
Recipients of the Order of Merit of the Federal Republic of Germany
21st-century Cypriot lawyers
Year of birth missing (living people)